Barbara Skarga (October 25, 1919 – September 18, 2009) was a Polish philosophy historian and philosopher who worked mainly in ethics and epistemology.

Biography 
Skarga was born in 1919 at Warsaw to a Calvinist family with gentry roots. Her sister was actress Hanna Skarżanka and brother was Edward Skarga. 
Skarga studied philosophy at Wilno University. During World War II she was a member of the resistance movement Armia Krajowa. In 1944 the Soviet NKVD arrested and sentenced her to ten years at the katorga. Afterwards, she was forced to live at a collective farm. She returned to Poland in 1955 and graduated in 1957 with a Ph.D. in philosophy at the University of Warsaw. In 1988 she became a full professor of philosophy. 
Skarga was an editor-in-chief of Etyka. In 1995 she was awarded Order of the White Eagle. 
She died on September 18, 2009, and was buried on September 25 in Warsaw.

Bibliography 

 Narodziny pozytywizmu polskiego 1831-1864 (1964)
 Kłopoty intelektu. Między Comte'em a Bergsonem (1975)
 Czas i trwanie. Studia nad Bergsonem (1982)
 Po wyzwoleniu 1944-1956 (1985)
 Przeszłość i interpretacje (1987)
 Granice historyczności (1989)
 Tożsamość i różnica. Eseje metafizyczne (1997)
 Ślad i obecność (2002)
 Kwintet metafizyczny (2005)
 Człowiek to nie jest piękne zwierzę (2007)
 Tercet metafizyczny (2009)

External links

1919 births
2009 deaths
Ontologists
Academic staff of the University of Lviv
Academic staff of the University of Warsaw
20th-century Polish philosophers
Home Army members
Polish Calvinist and Reformed Christians
Polish deportees to Soviet Union
Polish people detained by the NKVD
Polish women philosophers
Polish ethicists
Epistemologists
20th-century Polish women